Harunur Rashid Khan Monno (17 August 1932 – 1 August 2017) was a Bangladeshi industrialist and politician. He served as the Chairman of his conglomerate, Monno Group of Industries. He was elected a member of parliament and a minister (without portfolio) of the Government of Bangladesh. He was also an adviser to Bangladesh National Party Chairperson Khaleda Zia.

Career
While Monno was a student of chartered accountancy, he joined Adamjee Haji Dawood's company in the accounts department.  His first assignment was to print export register copies for the Adamjee conglomerate company. Within two years, he established a press company of his own. Later he established Monno Group of Industries, which included Monno Ceramics, Monno Jutex Industries, Monno Fabrics and Monno Attire Limited. He received lifetime achievement award at the 16th Bangladesh Business Awards.

Monno served as a Jatiya Sangsad member from the Manikganj-2 constituency during 1991–1996 and Manikganj-3 during 2001–2006. In 2001, he was selected a cabinet member without portfolio during the Khaleda Zia's administration. He lost the minister status in May 2003 when Zia was under pressure, especially from foreign donors, to downsize her cabinet.

Personal life
Monno was married to Huron Nahar. Together they had two daughters – Afroza Khan Rita and Feroza Mahmud Parvin. Afroza is serving as the Managing Director of Monno Group of Industries and also an adviser to Khaleda Zia. She is married to Moynul Islam and mother of 3 boys Feroza is married to journalist and businessman Mahmudur Rahman.

Death 
Monno died 1 August 2017 in Monno Medical College and Hospital, Manikganj District, Bangladesh.

See also 

 Monno Ceramic
 Monno Medical College

References

1932 births
2017 deaths
Bangladeshi businesspeople
Bangladesh Nationalist Party politicians
Bangladeshi Ministers without Portfolio
5th Jatiya Sangsad members
6th Jatiya Sangsad members
7th Jatiya Sangsad members
8th Jatiya Sangsad members
People from Manikganj District